Martin Torinus Torgerson (November 7, 1875 – June 12, 1935) was an American sailor serving in the United States Navy during the Boxer Rebellion who received the Medal of Honor for bravery.

Biography
Torgerson was born November 7, 1875 in Oleesen, Norway, and after entering the navy he was sent as an Gunner's Mate Third Class to China to fight in the Boxer Rebellion.

He died June 12, 1935 and is buried at Arlington National Cemetery, in Arlington, Virginia. His wife, Marie Larsen Torgerson is buried with him.

His son, Harry Torgerson, later served with the Paramarines in World War II, and was awarded the Silver Star for actions during the Battle of Guadalcanal in 1942.

Medal of Honor citation
Rank and organization. Gunner's Mate Third Class, U.S. Navy. Born: 7 November 1875, Oleesen, Norway. Accredited to. Virginia. G.O. No.: 55, 19 July 1901.

Citation:

In action with the relief expedition of the Allied Forces in China, 13, 20, 21, and 22 June 1900. During this period and in the presence of the enemy, Torgerson distinguished himself by meritorious conduct.

See also

 List of Medal of Honor recipients
 List of Medal of Honor recipients for the Boxer Rebellion

References

1875 births
1935 deaths
United States Navy Medal of Honor recipients
United States Navy officers
American military personnel of the Boxer Rebellion
Burials at Arlington National Cemetery
Boxer Rebellion recipients of the Medal of Honor
Norwegian emigrants to the United States
Norwegian-born Medal of Honor recipients